Middle Bay Light, also known as Middle Bay Lighthouse and Mobile Bay Lighthouse, is an active hexagonal-shaped cottage style screw-pile lighthouse. The structure is located offshore from Mobile, Alabama, in the center of Mobile Bay.

History
The station was activated in 1885. In 1916 the keeper's wife gave birth to a baby that summer at the station.  According to the Alabama Lighthouse Association web site, the keeper brought a dairy cow to the station and corralled it on a section of the lower deck because his wife was unable to nurse the newborn baby.  All had to be evacuated when the station survived but was damaged by a hurricane that year. The light was automated in 1935.

The lighthouse was placed on the National Register of Historic Places on December 30, 1974.  In 1984 the lighthouse was stabilized by Middle Bay Light Centennial Commission in preparation for the centennial celebration.  In 1996 the Coast Guard loaned the original Fresnel lens to the Ft. Morgan Museum for public display. In 2002 restoration efforts were begun to repair the lighthouse.

In 2003, a real-time weather station was added to the lighthouse by the Dauphin Island Sea Lab and the Mobile Bay National Estuary Program. Still running, the weather station, one of seven in Mobile Bay, samples precipitation, total and quantum solar radiation, air temperature, relative humidity, wind speed and direction, barometric pressure, water temperature, salinity, water depth, and dissolved oxygen. These data can be viewed in real time. From late 2011 - mid 2014 currents and waves were also displayed.

Light

Whale oil was the first fuel used and the lighthouse tenders worked in shifts making sure that the lamps did not go out and smoke the lens. In later years kerosene was used and eventually they were converted to electricity.

See also

 Mobile Point Range Lights
 Sand Island Light (Alabama)
 List of lighthouses in the United States

References

External links 
Alabama Lighthouse Association.

Lighthouse Friends, Middle Bay Light.
Middle Bay Lighthouse (Mobile) - United States Lighthouses

Lighthouses completed in 1885
National Register of Historic Places in Mobile County, Alabama
Lighthouses on the National Register of Historic Places in Alabama
Buildings and structures in Mobile, Alabama
Alabama State Historic Sites
Transportation buildings and structures in Mobile County, Alabama